Mohammad Nadeem is a Pakistani cricketer. He made his first-class debut for Islamabad in the 2018–19 Quaid-e-Azam Trophy on 1 September 2018. He was the leading wicket-taker for Islamabad in the tournament, with twenty-five dismissals in six matches.

References

External links
 

Year of birth missing (living people)
Living people
Pakistani cricketers
Islamabad cricketers
Place of birth missing (living people)